Ian David Karslake Watkins (born 30 July 1977) is a Welsh singer, songwriter, musician, and convicted sex offender. He was the lead vocalist, and lyricist of the rock band Lostprophets. In 2013, he was sentenced to 29 years of imprisonment for multiple sexual offences, including the sexual assault of young children and babies, a sentence later augmented by ten months for being found guilty of having a mobile phone in prison. Lostprophets disbanded shortly thereafter and the other members formed the band No Devotion, with American singer Geoff Rickly.

Early life
Ian David Karslake Watkins was born on 30 July 1977 in Merthyr Tydfil. He later moved to Pontypridd, where he attended Hawthorn High School with future Lostprophets bandmate Mike Lewis. He gained a first-class honours degree in graphic design from the University of Wales, Newport.

Career
Lewis' and Watkins's mutual enjoyment of rock and metal music strengthened their friendship, leading them to form a group as teenagers in 1991 called Aftermath, a thrash metal band that played in a shed in Watkins's garden. Whilst spending time in the local Ynysangharad Park, where (17 years later) Lostprophets would headline The Full Ponty festival, Watkins was introduced to future bandmate Lee Gaze through a mutual friend. Having abandoned Aftermath, which made two live appearances in its lifespan of two years, Watkins and Gaze decided to form a new band called Fleshbind, based on their American hardcore punk influences. The band played several shows, including one supporting Feeder in London, but the group was short-lived.

Watkins reunited with Mike Lewis as a drummer in a hardcore band called Public Disturbance, formed in 1995. By this time, Watkins and Gaze had left Fleshbind to create their own band, Lost Prophets, who made their live debut in May 1997 alongside Public Disturbance, with Watkins as the lead vocalist. In 1998, Watkins left Public Disturbance to concentrate on the newly named lostprophets (all lower-case letters).

In 2003, Watkins was featured on the Hoobastank song "Out of Control" along with Jamie Oliver, who was by then a member of Lostprophets.

On New Year's Eve 2008, Watkins took part in a concert for Kidney Wales Foundation and stated that his reasons for being involved were as a result of his mother needing a kidney transplant: "Having that direct experience is why I wanted to get more involved with Kidney Wales and organise a fundraising concert on New Year's Eve." The concert featured Welsh bands the Blackout, Kids in Glass Houses, and Attack! Attack!

Watkins was also featured on the Blackout's song "It's High Tide Baby!" from their debut studio album We Are the Dynamite (2007), and also accompanied them on tour.

In 2009, Watkins started a remixing side project called "L'Amour La Morgue". He released 17 remixes by artists such as the Killers, Beyoncé, Young Guns, Magic Wands, Tears for Fears, and Bring Me the Horizon. He also released a free mixtape, which was available online, along with a free download of a song that was premiered at a fashion show in 2008.

Lostprophets released five studio albums: The Fake Sound of Progress (2000), Start Something (2004), Liberation Transmission (2006), The Betrayed (2010), and Weapons (2012). They toured extensively in Europe and America, playing shows such as the Reading and Leeds Festivals in 2004, 2007, 2009, and 2010.

Sexual offences and criminal activity

Conviction
On 19 December 2012, Watkins was charged at Cardiff magistrates court with conspiracy to engage in sexual activity with a one-year-old girl and possession and/or distribution of indecent images of children and "extreme animal pornography". He was remanded in custody, as were his two female co-accused. His barrister said Watkins would deny the accusations. On 31 December, he appeared at Cardiff Crown Court via video link from HM Prison Parc in Bridgend, and was remanded in custody until 11 March 2013. The case was adjourned until May, with the trial date set for 15 July. At a hearing on 3 June, he denied the charges via a video link.

On 6 June, it was announced that the trial would start on 25 November and was expected to last a month. A previous application for the court venue to be moved outside Wales was denied. On 26 November, Watkins pleaded guilty to attempted rape and sexual assault of a child under 13, but not guilty to rape. This was accepted by the prosecution. He further pleaded guilty to three counts of sexual assault involving children; six counts of taking, making, or possessing indecent images of children; and one count of possessing an extreme pornographic image involving a sex act on an animal. His victims included a baby boy, and he sent a text message to the mother of one victim that said, "If you belong to me, so does your baby." The South Wales Police investigation into Watkins, codenamed "Operation Globe", required the co-operation of GCHQ to decrypt a hidden drive on his laptop, which was found to contain video evidence of his abuses. On 27 November, the day after his guilty plea had been accepted by the prosecution, Watkins referred to his sex offences as "mega lolz" in a recorded phone call to a female fan made from HM Prison Parc.

A sentencing hearing was held at Cardiff on 18 December 2013. In mitigation, Watkins's barrister, Sally O'Neill QC, said that Watkins had no recollection of the case involving the attempted rape, but had "belatedly realised the gravity of what happened" after having developed an "obsession" with videoing himself having sex. Justice John Royce sentenced Watkins to 29 years in prison, with eligibility to apply for parole after serving two thirds of his prison term, followed by six years of supervised release. His two co-defendants, the mothers of his victims, received sentences of 14 and 17 years imprisonment. The judge said the case "plunged into new depths of depravity". A senior investigating officer on the case described Watkins as a "committed, organised paedophile" and "potentially the most dangerous sex offender" he had ever seen.

Watkins was transferred from HM Prison Parc, where he had been incarcerated while on remand, to HM Prison Wakefield to begin serving his sentence. In order to be closer to his mother after she had a kidney transplant, he was transferred to HM Prison Long Lartin on 25 January 2014. He was subsequently transferred to HM Prison Rye Hill. On 9 October 2017, Watkins was accused of grooming a young mother from prison. As of March 2018, he is back at Wakefield.

Police complaints 
An Independent Police Complaints Commission (IPCC) investigation report published in summer 2016 said that three detectives from the South Wales force should face disciplinary action after they failed to act on earlier allegations of abuse by Watkins from 2008 onward.

A further IPCC report, published in August 2017, found that police had failed a number of times from 2008 to 2012 to act on reports of Watkins' behaviour, quoting a detective who said that Watkins had "a number of fans and ex-girlfriends making allegations that when investigated are false". The report concluded:

South Wales Police Assistant Chief Constable Jeremy Vaughan said his force "entirely accepts and regrets" the findings of the report.

Possession of mobile phone in prison 
In March 2018, Watkins was found with a mobile phone. He was accused of using the phone to maintain contact with a girlfriend outside of prison, but denied the charge, claiming it did not belong to him but to two inmates who forced him to hide it for them; he refused to give their names, citing fear of violent retribution. A charger for the phone was also found in his cell. Watkins claimed he still received fan mail from Lostprophets fans and that the men wanted him to help them take advantage of the women writing in as a "revenue stream". After a five-day trial at Leeds Crown Court in August 2019, he was convicted and sentenced to an additional ten months' imprisonment, to run consecutively to his existing sentence.

Discography
Public Disturbance
 4-Way Tie Up (1997)
 UKHC Compilation (1997)
 Victim of Circumstance (1998)

Lostprophets

 The Fake Sound of Progress (2000)
 Start Something (2004)
 Liberation Transmission (2006)
 The Betrayed (2010)
 Weapons (2012)

References

Further reading
 The Honourable Mr Justice Royce; Between: The Queen V Ian Watkins & B & P – Judiciary Court Documentation (Archive)
 IPCC investigations

External links

 
 
 
 

1977 births
20th-century drummers
20th-century Welsh male singers
21st-century drummers
21st-century Welsh criminals
21st-century Welsh male singers
Alternative rock singers
Alumni of the University of Wales, Newport
British alternative rock musicians
British lyricists
British criminals
British male drummers
British male singer-songwriters
British people convicted of attempted rape
British people convicted of sexual assault
Living people
Lostprophets members
Nu metal singers
People convicted of sex crimes
People educated at Hawthorn High School
People from Merthyr Tydfil
People from Pontypridd
Prisoners and detainees of England and Wales
Welsh people convicted of child sexual abuse
Welsh prisoners and detainees
Welsh rock drummers
Welsh rock singers
Welsh sex offenders
Welsh singer-songwriters
Welsh people convicted of child pornography offences